Zinta is a Latvian feminine given name. The name day of persons named Zinta is April 6.

Notable people
Zinta Valda Ziemelis (1937–2014), birth name of American actress Cynthia Lynn
Zinta Flitten (b. 1979), Norfolk Island track and field athlete

References 

Latvian feminine given names
Feminine given names